Rhynchopyga elongata is a species of moth in the subfamily Arctiinae. It is found in Ecuador.

References

Natural History Museum Lepidoptera generic names catalog

Moths described in 1890
Euchromiina